The Directorate of Customs is the national customs service of Iceland. The Directorate of Customs is the law enforcement agency, which is in charge of not only the collection of customs duties, but also the detection of smuggling and confiscation of counterfeit items entering Iceland.

Organisation 

The Directorate of Customs was established in 1929, after the Act of Union allowed Iceland to create foreign policy apart from that of the Kingdom of Denmark. The Directorate of Customs falls under the Ministry of Finance and Economic Affairs, as its primary duty is to control import duties, taxes, tariffs, and other state revenues.

The Directorate of Customs is not divided into separate regions or districts and has its headquarters at Tryggvagata 19, 101 Reykjavík. There are approximately 250 employees in the Directorate of Customs, who are spread out in various departments and duty-stations throughout Iceland.

Collections duties 

Aside from standard customs actions, which involve the collection of duties and tariffs on items imported into Iceland, as the sole enforcement agency for the Ministry of Finance and Economic Affairs and Directorate of Internal Revenue, the Directorate of Customs is also charged with the collection of various state taxes.

The taxes which Directorate of Customs collects include:
 National and municipal income tax
 Automobile tax
 Road tax
 Value added tax
 Wealth tax

Property tax is handled by the municipalities and is thus not a customs matter.

Powers 

The Directorate of Customs has various powers, empowered by the Customs law. 

 Free and unhindered access - the Customs are authorized to patrol anywhere on and along the coast of the country, in harbour areas and airports.
 Customs officers are allowed to use force in the execution of their duties - and are allowed to use handcuffs and pepper spray.
 Customs officers are allowed to arrest a person caught, or suspected of violating laws enforced by customs officers. 
 Customs officers are allowed to search anywhere in any vessel within the Icelandic customs territory. 
 Customs officers are allowed to inspect and investigate all goods transported to the country. 
 Customs officers are allowed pursue persons who evade or try to evade.
 Customs officers can search buildings after a pursuit, in which a waiting for a court ruling might cause evidence being destroyed. 
 Customs officers are authorized to search persons who are in means of transport, in buildings or in areas or on their way from means of transport, buildings or places where customs officers are authorized to investigate and inspect goods. 
 Customs officers shall seize items considered to have value as evidence in a criminal case, if they have been obtained by criminal means or if it may be assumed that they might become subject to confiscation due to violations of the Customs Law or other laws.
 If an importer, exporter, customs broker, traveller or crew member brings financial assets into the country from abroad or from the country to a foreign country the executors of customs enforcement authority have the discretion to confiscate the assets when there is suspicion of said assets being used to commit a violation against the penalty clauses of the General Penal Code.
 The Customs can circumscribe a vessel which has arrived in port or at an airport, and also prohibit traffic in areas where loading or unloading of goods takes place, or through which passengers pass on their way to or from a vessel in international journeys. Furthermore the Customs can stipulate that passengers or other persons may only disembark or go on board at a certain place or at a specified time. In consultation with port authorities, the Customs can also stipulate that the loading or unloading of a vessel shall be carried out at a specific place which at any given time is considered to be the most suitable for control purposes.
 If necessary the Customs can summon for assistance every adult person. A person is obliged to comply with the summons of the Customs if he is able to render assistance without putting his life, health, well being or substantial personal interests or those of near relatives in danger. Those summoned to assist the Customs are empowered with customs enforcement authority while carrying out their duties and enjoy the same protection as customs officers. 
 No one may in any way obstruct a person in the performance of customs duties or disobey instructions given by customs officers for the purpose of applying the relevant laws.

Ranks

Insignia

References

External links 

  
  

Law enforcement agencies of Iceland
Government agencies of Iceland
Customs services